Arctic Air is a Canadian drama television series that began airing on CBC Television on January 10, 2012.

On March 17, 2014, the series was canceled due to government budgetary cuts. In total, 35 episodes aired over the three seasons.

Series overview 
{| class="wikitable plainrowheaders" style="text-align:center;"
|-
! scope="col" style="padding:0 8px;" colspan="2" rowspan="2"|Season
! scope="col" style="padding:0 8px;" rowspan="2"|Episodes
! scope="col" style="padding:0 8px;" colspan="2"|Originally aired
|-
! scope="col" | First aired
! scope="col" | Last aired
|-
| scope="row" style="width:12px; background:#005C94;"|
| [[List of Arctic Air episodes#Season 1 (2012)|1]]
| 10
| style="padding:0 8px" | 
| style="padding:0 8px" | 
|-
| scope="row" style="width:12px; background:#FF9933;"|
| [[List of Arctic Air episodes#Season 2 (2013)|2]]
| 13
| 
| 
|-
| scope="row" style="width:12px; background:#006705;"|
| [[List of Arctic Air episodes#Season 3 (2014)|3]]
| 12
| 
| 
|-
|}

Episodes

Season 1 (2012)

Season 2 (2013)

Season 3 (2014)

References

External links

Lists of Canadian television series episodes